Call of the Wild is the third studio album by American country music singer Aaron Tippin. Released in 1993 on RCA Records Nashville, it produced the singles "The Call of the Wild", "Honky-Tonk Superman", "Workin' Man's Ph.D.", and "Whole Lotta Love on the Line". Of these, only "Workin' Man's Ph.D" reached Top 10 on the U.S. Billboard country charts. The album was produced by Scott Hendricks, unlike Tippin's first two albums which were produced by Emory Gordy, Jr.

Critical reception
Brian Mansfield of Allmusic gave the album three stars out of five, saying that "some of Tippin's song choices were hillbilly silly." Mike Greenblatt of Modern Screen's Country Music gave a mostly-favorable review, saying that the album showed a sense of artistic growth over his first two discs, making note of Tippin's "one-of-a-kind, elastic voice" but referring to "Whole Lotta Love on the Line" as being "in that netherworld of benign country fluff."

Track listing

Personnel
Adapted from liner notes.

Stuart Duncan – fiddle, mandolin on "Whole Lotta Love on the Line"
Paul Franklin – pedal steel guitar
Brent Mason – electric guitar
Alan O'Bryant – background vocals on "The Call of the Wild"
Matt Rollings – piano
John Wesley Ryles – background vocals on all tracks except "Whole Lotta Love on the Line", "The Call of the Wild", and "When Country Took the Throne"
Aaron Tippin - lead vocals
Cindy Richardson Walker – background vocals on "I Promised You the World"
Billy Joe Walker Jr. – acoustic guitar
Dennis Wilson – background vocals on "I Promised You the World"
Lonnie Wilson – drums
Glenn Worf – bass guitar

Charts

Weekly charts

Year-end charts

References

1993 albums
Albums produced by Scott Hendricks
RCA Records albums
Aaron Tippin albums